SCEL may refer to:

Arturo Merino Benítez International Airport, ICAO airport code SCEL
SCEL (gene)
South Carolina Education Lottery
Southern Counties East Football League